= Ecological park =

Ecological park may refer to:

- Nature reserve
- Nature park
- Protected area, some other types of protected areas in several countries
